Myoporum tenuifolium is a plant in the figwort family, Scrophulariaceae and it is endemic to New Caledonia and the Loyalty Islands. It can be distinguished from Myoporum crassifolium, (the only other member of the genus to occur in New Caledonia) by its very thin leaves and its glabrous flowers.

Description
They are unusually thin and membranous, elliptic in shape and have a distinct mid-vein on the lower surface.

The flowers have five triangular sepals and five petals joined at their bases to form a bell-shaped tube. The tube and its lobes are glabrous and there are four stamens that extend slightly beyond it.

Taxonomy and naming
Myoporum tenuifolium was first formally described in 1786 by Georg Forster in Florulae Insularum Australium Prodromus in 1810. The specific epithet (tenuifolium) is derived from the Latin words tenuis meaning "slender" and folium, "leaf".

Distribution and habitat
Myoporum tenuifolium is found on Grande Terre, the main island of New Caledonia and on Maré Island and Ouvéa in the Loyalty Island group. It grows in scrub and forest, often on steep hillsides.

Ecology
This species has become naturalised on the southern coast of South Africa.

Use in horticulture
Myoporum tenuifolium is a common garden plant in eastern Spain.

References

tenuifolium
Flora of New Caledonia
Plants described in 1786
Taxa named by Georg Forster